One For My Baby – To Frank Sinatra With Love is American jazz singer Laura Dickinson's debut album, which was released by Music & Mirror Records on December 12, 2014 in celebration of Frank Sinatra's 99th birthday and centennial year.

Track listing
"Come Fly With Me" (Jimmy Van Heusen, Sammy Cahn) – 3:34
"Learnin' The Blues" (Dolores Vicki Silvers) – 3:05
"(Love Is) The Tender Trap" (Jimmy Van Heusen, Sammy Cahn) – 2:33
"Guess I'll Hang My Tears Out To Dry" (Jule Styne, Sammy Cahn) – 4:34
"You're Getting To Be A Habit With Me" (Harry Warren, Al Dubin) – 3:13
"Here's To The Losers" (Robert Wells (songwriter), Jack Segal) – 2:45
"Indian Summer (Victor Herbert song)" (Victor Herbert, Al Dubin) – 3:36
"You Go To My Head" (J. Fred Coots, Haven Gillespie) – 5:07
"How About You?" (Burton Lane, Ralph Freed) – 3:08
"The Best Is Yet to Come" (Cy Coleman, Carolyn Leigh) – 3:15
"I Only Have Eyes For You" (featuring Danny Jacob) (Harry Warren, Al Dubin) – 3:56
"My Funny Valentine" (featuring Neil Stubenhaus) (Richard Rodgers, Lorenz Hart) – 5:09
"I'm Gonna Live Till I Die" (Curtis/Hoffman/Kent) - 2:52
"All The Way" (Jimmy Van Heusen, Sammy Cahn) - 4:05
"One For My Baby" (featuring Vince di Mura) (Harold Arlen, Johnny Mercer) - 4:29

Selected personnel
 Laura Dickinson - vocals
 Gordon Goodwin - arranger
 Quincy Jones - arranger
 John Clayton (bassist) - arranger
 Sammy Nestico - arranger
 Marty Paich - arranger
 Neil Stubenhaus - bass guitar
 Randy Kerber - piano
 Danny Jacob - guitar
 Chuck Findley - trumpet
 Wayne Bergeron - trumpet

References

2014 debut albums
Frank Sinatra tribute albums